Cheshmeh Bid Cheng Baradeh (also Romanized as Cheshmeh Bīd Cheng Baradeh; also known as Cheshmeh Bīd) is a village in Robat Rural District, in the Central District of Khorramabad County, Lorestan Province, Iran. At the 2006 census, its population was 64, in 16 families.

References 

Towns and villages in Khorramabad County